The 1971 Centennial Cup is the first Tier II Junior "A" 1971 ice hockey National Championship for the Canadian Junior A Hockey League.

The Centennial Cup was competed for by the winners of the Western Canadian Champions and the Eastern Canadian Champions.

The finals were hosted by the Charlottetown Islanders in the city of Charlottetown, Prince Edward Island.

The Manitoba Centennial Trophy was presented to the Canadian Amateur Hockey Association (CAHA) by the Manitoba Amateur Hockey Association to commemorate their centennial year of 1970.

The Playoffs

Prior to Regionals
Thunder Bay Marrs (TBJHL) defeated Sudbury Wolves (NOJHA) 4-games-to-3
Charlottetown Islanders (MarJHL) defeated Moncton Hawks (NBJHL) 4-games-to-none

MCC Finals

Regional Championships
Abbott Cup: Red Deer Rustlers
Dudley Hewitt Cup: Charlottetown Islanders
Doyle Cup: Red Deer Rustlers
Anavet Cup: St. Boniface Saints

Roll of League Champions
AJHL: Red Deer Rustlers
BCJHL: Victoria Cougars
CJHL: Ottawa M&W Rangers
MJHL: St. Boniface Saints
MarJHL: Charlottetown Isles
NBJHL: Moncton Hawks
NOJHA: Sudbury Wolves
SJHL: Weyburn Red Wings
SOJAHL: Detroit Jr. Red Wings
TBJHL: Thunder Bay Marrs

See also
Canadian Junior A Hockey League
Royal Bank Cup
Anavet Cup
Doyle Cup
Dudley Hewitt Cup
Fred Page Cup
Abbott Cup
Mowat Cup

External links
Royal Bank Cup Website

1971
Cup